Avutometinib (INN; codenamed RO-5126766, CH-5126766, CKI-27, R-7304, RG-7304, and VS-6766 at various stages of its development) is an inhibitor of Ras-Raf-MEK-ERK signaling being developed as a potential treatment for cancer.

It was discovered by Chugai Pharmaceutical Co. (a subsidiary of Roche) through derivatization of a hit compound identified by high-throughput screening. It was licensed by Verastem Oncology in 2020 for clinical trials.

References

MEK inhibitors
Sulfamides
Pyridines
Pyrimidines
Fluoroarenes
Coumarins